Pioneer American film director D. W. Griffith (1875–1948) enjoyed a wide sphere of influence among his colleagues, including several who worked well past the end of the silent era, which proved the demarcation point for the end of Griffith's own career as director. This influence extended from directors that Griffith collaborated with and trained such as Mack Sennett and Frank Powell through those who only had glancing contact with him—such as Erich von Stroheim—and yet others in foreign lands who never worked with Griffith directly, for example Jean Renoir and Sergei Eisenstein. The primary purpose of this list is to document the director names in the first two classes, while a more selective view is to be taken in the last class.

Griffith himself principally learned his craft with cinematographer/director Billy Bitzer, who worked alongside Griffith, with a few interruptions, practically his whole career. Many of the technical developments once credited to Griffith were actually developed by Bitzer before they met.

A
John G. Adolfi

B
George Beranger
Arthur Berthelet
Frank Borzage
Karl Brown
Tod Browning
David Butler

C
Christy Cabanne
Harry Carey
Charles Chaplin
Elmer Clifton
Jack Conway
Donald Crisp

D
Cecil B. DeMille
Edward Dillon
John Francis Dillon (director)
Thomas Dixon, Jr.
Carl Theodor Dreyer
Allan Dwan

E
Sergei Eisenstein
John Emerson

F
George Fawcett
Victor Fleming
John Ford
Sidney Franklin

G
Abel Gance
Gene Gauntier
Clarence Geldart
Lillian Gish
Francis J. Grandon

H
Joseph Henabery
Dell Henderson
George Hill

I
Rex Ingram
Charles Inslee

J
Arthur V. Johnson

K
Henry King
James Kirkwood, Sr.
Dimitri Kirsanoff

L
Wilfred Lucas

M
John P. McCarthy
Oscar Micheaux
David Miles
Owen Moore

N
George Nicholls Jr.
Mabel Normand

O
Anthony O'Sullivan

P
Alfred Paget
Mary Pickford
Frank Powell
Vsevolod Pudovkin

Q
Billy Quirk

R
Wallace Reid
Jean Renoir

S
Mack Sennett
George Siegmann
Harry Solter
Erich von Stroheim

T
John Tansey
Stanner E. V. Taylor
George Terwilliger

U

V
W. S. Van Dyke
King Vidor
Robert G. Vignola

W
George Walsh
Raoul Walsh
Millard Webb
Raymond Wells
Jules White

X

Y

Z

Griffith